Elections to Sedgefield Borough Council were held on 1 May 2003.  The whole council was up for election with boundary changes since the last election in 1999.  The Labour Party stayed in overall control of the council.

Election result

|}

12 Labour candidates were unopposed.

Ward results

External links
 2003 Sedgefield election result

2003
2003 English local elections
2000s in County Durham